Albert Davies  (1869 – 1940) was a Welsh international football player. He was part of the Wales national football team, playing 1 match and scoring 1 goal on 7 February 1891 against Ireland. At club level, he played for Shrewsbury Town.

See also
 List of Wales international footballers (alphabetical)

References

External links
 

Welsh footballers
Wales international footballers
Shrewsbury Town F.C. players
Association football forwards
1869 births
1940 deaths
Place of birth missing
Date of death missing